Carreña is one of nine parishes (administrative divisions) in Cabrales, a municipality within the province and autonomous community of Asturias, in northern Spain.

Villages
 Asiego 
 Carreña 
 Pandellana

References

Parishes in Cabrales